Joan Blondell (born Rose Joan Bluestein; August 30, 1906 – December 25, 1979) was an American actress who performed in film and television for 50 years.

Blondell began her career in vaudeville. After winning a beauty pageant, she embarked on a film career, establishing herself as a Pre-Code staple of Warner Bros. Pictures in wisecracking, sexy roles, appearing in more than 100 films and television productions. She was most active in film during the 1930s and early 1940s, and during that time co-starred with Glenda Farrell, a colleague and close friend, in nine films. Blondell continued acting on film and television for the rest of her life, often in small, supporting roles. She was nominated for an Academy Award for Best Supporting Actress for her performance in The Blue Veil (1951).

Near the end of her life, Blondell was nominated for a Golden Globe for Best Supporting Actress for her performance in Opening Night (1977). She was featured in two more films, the blockbuster musical Grease (1978) and Franco Zeffirelli's The Champ (1979), which was released shortly before her death from leukemia.

Early life
Rose Joan Blondell was born in New York to a vaudeville family; she gave her birthdate as August 30, 1906. Her father, Levi Bluestein, a vaudeville comedian known as Ed Blondell, was born in Poland to a Jewish family in 1866. He toured for many years starring in Blondell and Fennessy's stage version of The Katzenjammer Kids. Blondell's mother was Catherine (known as "Kathryn" or "Katie") Caine, born in Brooklyn, Kings County, New York (later Brooklyn, New York City) on April 13, 1884, to Irish-American parents. Joan's younger sister, Gloria Blondell, also an actress, was briefly married to film producer Albert R. Broccoli. Joan also had a brother, Ed Blondell, Jr.

Joan's cradle was a property trunk as her parents moved from place to place. She made her first appearance on stage at the age of four months when she was carried on in a cradle as the daughter of Peggy Astaire in The Greatest Love. Her family comprised a vaudeville troupe, the Bouncing Blondells.

Joan had spent a year in Honolulu (1914–15) and six years in Australia and had seen much of the world by the time her family stopped touring and settled in Dallas, Texas when she was a teenager. Using the name Rosebud Blondell, she won the 1926 Miss Dallas pageant, was a finalist in an early version of the Miss Universe pageant in May 1926, and placed fourth for Miss America 1926 in Atlantic City, New Jersey, in September of that year. She attended Santa Monica High School, where she acted in school plays and edited the school yearbook. While there, she gave her name as Rosebud Blondell, and when she attended North Texas State Teacher's College (now the University of North Texas) in Denton in 1926–1927 where her mother was a local stage actress.

Career

Around 1927, she returned to New York, worked as a fashion model, a circus hand, a clerk in a store, joined a stock company to become an actress, and performed on Broadway. In 1930, she starred with James Cagney in Penny Arcade on Broadway. Penny Arcade lasted only three weeks, but Al Jolson saw it and bought the rights to the play for $20,000. He then sold the rights to Warner Bros., with the proviso that Blondell and Cagney be cast in the film version, named Sinners' Holiday (1930). Placed under contract by Warner Bros., she moved to Hollywood, where studio boss Jack L. Warner wanted her to change her name to "Inez Holmes", but Blondell refused. She began to appear in short subjects and was named as one of the WAMPAS Baby Stars in 1931.

Blondell was paired several more times with James Cagney in films, including The Public Enemy (1931) and Footlight Parade (1933), and was one-half of a gold-digging duo with Glenda Farrell in nine films. During the Great Depression, Blondell was one of the highest-paid individuals in the United States. Her stirring rendition of "Remember My Forgotten Man" in the Busby Berkeley production of Gold Diggers of 1933, in which she co-starred with Dick Powell and Ruby Keeler, became an anthem for the frustrations of unemployed people and the government's failed economic policies. In 1937, she starred opposite Errol Flynn in The Perfect Specimen. By the end of the decade, she had made nearly 50 films. She left Warner Bros. in 1939.

In 1943, Blondell returned to Broadway as the star of Mike Todd's short-lived production of The Naked Genius, a comedy written by Gypsy Rose Lee. She was well received in her later films, despite being relegated to character and supporting roles after 1945, when she was billed below the title for the first time in 14 years in Adventure, which starred Clark Gable and Greer Garson. She was also featured prominently in A Tree Grows in Brooklyn (1945) and Nightmare Alley (1947). In 1948, she left the screen for three years and concentrated on theater, performing in summer stock and touring with Cole Porter's musical, Something for the Boys. She later reprised her role of Aunt Sissy in the musical version of A Tree Grows in Brooklyn for the national tour and played the nagging mother, Mae Peterson, in the national tour of Bye Bye Birdie.

Blondell returned to Hollywood in 1950. Her performance in her next film, The Blue Veil (1951), earned her an Academy Award nomination for Best Actress in a Supporting Role. She played supporting roles in The Opposite Sex (1956), Desk Set (1957), and Will Success Spoil Rock Hunter? (1957). She received considerable acclaim for her performance as Lady Fingers in Norman Jewison's The Cincinnati Kid (1965), garnering a Golden Globe nomination and National Board of Review win for Best Supporting Actress. John Cassavetes cast her as a cynical, aging playwright in his film Opening Night (1977). Blondell was widely seen in two films released not long before her death – Grease (1978), and the remake of The Champ (1979) with Jon Voight and Rick Schroder. She also appeared in two films released after her death – The Glove (1979), and The Woman Inside (1981).

Blondell also guest-starred in various television programs, including three 1963 episodes as the character Aunt Win in the CBS sitcom The Real McCoys, starring Walter Brennan and Richard Crenna.

Also in 1963, Blondell was cast as the widowed Lucy Tutaine in the episode, "The Train and Lucy Tutaine", on the syndicated anthology series, Death Valley Days, hosted by Stanley Andrews. In the story line, Lucy sues a railroad company, against great odds, for causing the death of her cow. Noah Beery Jr., was cast as Abel.

In 1964, she appeared in the episode "What's in the Box?" of The Twilight Zone. She guest-starred in the episode "You're All Right, Ivy" on Jack Palance's circus drama, The Greatest Show on Earth, which aired on ABC in the 1963–64 television season. Her co-stars in the segment were Joe E. Brown and Buster Keaton. In 1965, she was in the running to replace Vivian Vance as Lucille Ball's sidekick on the hit CBS television comedy series The Lucy Show. Unfortunately, after filming her second guest appearance as Joan Brenner (Lucy's new friend from California), Blondell walked off the set right after the episode had completed filming when Ball humiliated her by harshly criticizing her performance in front of the studio audience and technicians.

Blondell continued working on television. In 1968, she guest-starred on the CBS sitcom Family Affair, starring Brian Keith. She replaced Bea Benaderet, who was ill, for one episode on the CBS series Petticoat Junction. In that installment, Blondell played FloraBelle Campbell, a lady visitor to Hooterville, who had once dated Uncle Joe (Edgar Buchanan) and Sam Drucker (Frank Cady). That same year, Blondell co-starred in all 52 episodes of the ABC Western series Here Come the Brides, set in the Pacific Northwest of the 19th century. Her co-stars included singer Bobby Sherman and actor-singer David Soul. Blondell received two consecutive Emmy nominations for outstanding continued performance by an actress in a dramatic series for her role as Lottie Hatfield.

In 1971, she followed Sada Thompson in the off-Broadway hit The Effect of Gamma Rays on Man-in-the-Moon Marigolds, with a young Swoosie Kurtz playing one of her daughters.

In 1972, she had an ongoing supporting role in the NBC series Banyon as Peggy Revere, who operated a secretarial school in the same building as Banyon's detective agency. This was a 1930s period action drama starring Robert Forster in the title role. Her students worked in Banyon's office, providing fresh faces for the show weekly. The series was replaced midseason.

Blondell has a motion pictures star on the Hollywood Walk of Fame for her contributions to the film industry. Her star is located at 6311 Hollywood Boulevard. In December 2007, the Museum of Modern Art in New York City mounted a retrospective of Blondell's films in connection with a new biography by film professor Matthew Kennedy, and theatrical revival houses such as Film Forum in Manhattan have also projected many of her films recently.

She wrote a novel titled Center Door Fancy (New York: Delacorte Press, 1972), which was a thinly disguised autobiography with veiled references to June Allyson and Dick Powell.

Personal life

Blondell was married three times, first to cinematographer George Barnes in a private wedding ceremony on January 4, 1933, at the First Presbyterian Church in Phoenix, Arizona. They had one child, Norman Scott Barnes, who became an accomplished producer, director, and television executive known as Norman Powell. Joan and George divorced in 1936.

On September 19, 1936, she married Dick Powell, an actor, director, and singer. They had a daughter, Ellen Powell, who became a studio hair stylist, and Powell adopted her son by her previous marriage under the name Norman Scott Powell. Blondell and Powell were divorced on July 14, 1944. Blondell was less than friendly with Powell's next wife, June Allyson, although the two women later appeared together in The Opposite Sex (1956).

On July 5, 1947, Blondell married producer Mike Todd. Her marriage to Todd was an emotional and financial disaster that ended in divorce in 1950. She once accused him of holding her outside a hotel window by her ankles. He was also a heavy spender who lost hundreds of thousands of dollars gambling (high-stakes bridge was one of his weaknesses) and went through a controversial bankruptcy during their marriage. An often-repeated myth is that Mike Todd left Blondell for Elizabeth Taylor, when in fact, she had left Todd of her own accord years before he met Taylor.

Death
Blondell died of leukemia in Santa Monica, California, on Christmas Day, 1979, with her children and her sister at her bedside. She was cremated and her ashes interred in a columbarium at the Forest Lawn Memorial Park Cemetery in Glendale, California. She was 73.

Filmography

Feature films

Short films

Television

Radio broadcasts

Gallery

Notes

References

Further reading
 Oderman, Stuart. Talking to the Piano Player 2. BearManor Media, 2009. 
 Grabman, Sandra. Plain Beautiful: The Life of Peggy Ann Garner. BearManor Media, 2005.

External links

 
 
 
 
 Photographs of Joan Blondell
 Joan Blondell Q&A with Biographer Matthew Kennedy

1906 births
1979 deaths
20th-century American actresses
Actresses from Santa Monica, California
Actresses from New York City
American beauty pageant winners
Female models from California
American film actresses
American people of Irish descent
Jewish American actresses
American stage actresses
Burials at Forest Lawn Memorial Park (Glendale)
Deaths from cancer in California
Deaths from leukemia
Miss America 1920s delegates
Vaudeville performers
Warner Bros. contract players
Ziegfeld girls
California Republicans
Female models from New York (state)
Models from New York City
New York (state) Republicans
WAMPAS Baby Stars